Catherine Mouchet (born 21 August 1959) is a French actress.

She studied at the Conservatoire de Paris, following the courses of Jacques Lassalle and Claude Régy. Her performance in the film Thérèse, directed by Alain Cavalier, won her the César Award for Most Promising Actress for 1987.

Career
Having been acclaimed for her appearance in Thérèse, she next appeared in Claude Goretta's Si le soleil ne revenait pas in 1987, and then devoted herself to theatre for a time. She appeared in works by Luigi Pirandello,  (Vêtir ceux qui sont nus), and Alfred de Musset,  (Les Caprices de Marianne), amongst others, and directed La Petite dame with Claude Guyonnet in 1992.  She returned to the screen in Jean-Pierre Mocky's Bonsoir 1993, and in Louis and Xavier Bachelot's short film La Plante. On television she appeared in the saga Jalna, directed by Philippe Monnier from the books of Mazo de la Roche, and Le blanc à lunettes, directed by Édouard Nierman, from a Georges Simenon novel.  She then studied for a degree in philosophy.

She returned to the screen and played supporting roles in two Olivier Assayas films, Fin août, début septembre and Les Destinées sentimentales. She appeared in Pierre Jolivet's My Little Business, for which she received a nomination for the  César Award for Best Supporting Actress, and Philippe Harel's 1999 Extension du domaine de la lutte, an adaptation of Michel Houellebecq's controversial breakthrough novel Whatever,  in which she played a  psychoanalyst. She played a prostitute in Patrice Leconte's Rue des Plaisirs. She continues to appear in a wide variety of roles in both auteur films and popular comedies, and for both first time directors and established talents.

In October 2008 Mouchet appeared at the Théâtre National de Strasbourg in Jean Magnan's  "et pourtant ce silence ne pouvait être vide", based, like Jean Genet's The Maids, on the Papin sisters murders in 1933.

Filmography
Thérèse     1986
Si le soleil ne revenait pas (If the Sun Never Returns)  1987
La plante  short film  1993
Bonsoir     1993
Jalna   (TV)  1994
Le blanc à lunettes  (TV) 1995
Fin août, début septembre 1998
Whatever (Extension du domaine de la lutte)  1999
My Little Business  1999
J'ai tué Clémence Acéra 2000
Du Côté des filles  2000
Les Destinées sentimentales 2000
La Danse des asperges sarrasines short film  2000
Mortel transfert 2001
Le Pornographe  2001
Rue des plaisirs  2001
HS Hors Service  2001
Elle est des nôtres  2002
Petites coupures 2002
La Repentie  2002
Ecrivain d'O  2004
Nos Vies Rêvées   (TV) 2004
Coup de vache (TV) 2004
Nature contre nature (TV) 2004
Un Jour d'été (TV film) 2005
Au royaume des aveugles  short film (2005)
Madame Irma  2006
Les Deux Mondes  2007
Clémentine (2008)
Dans tes bras  (2009)
L'Arbre et la Forêt (2009)
Pigalle, la nuit  (TV)  (2009)
Dumas (2010)
The Monk (2011) adapted from Matthew Lewis's gothic novel The Monk.
Le Désert de l'amour (The desert of love) (TV film) (2012) directed by Jean-Daniel Verhaeghe
Clash (TV) (2012)
Les petits meurtres d'Agatha Christie (TV) (2013)
Mon Amie Victoria (2014), directed by Jean-Paul Civeyrac, from a novella by Doris Lessing
Marguerite & Julien (2015)
Looking for Her (2016)
Reinventing Marvin (2017)

References

External links

 commeaucinema filmography
 
 short video of Catherine Mouchet receiving César Award
 cv

French film actresses
1959 births
Living people
Conservatoire de Paris alumni
Actresses from Paris
21st-century French actresses
20th-century French actresses
Most Promising Actress César Award winners